Aleksandr Sergeyevich Bem (born 19 April 2001) is a Russian football player who plays for FC Tyumen.

Club career
He made his debut in the Russian Football National League for FC Tyumen on 3 March 2019 in a game against FC Sibir Novosibirsk, as a 52nd minute substitute for Mikhail Kovalenko.

References

External links
 Profile by Russian Football National League
 

2001 births
Living people
Russian footballers
Russia youth international footballers
FC Tyumen players
Russian First League players
Russian Second League players
Association football defenders